A doily (also doiley, doilie, doyly, or doyley) is an ornamental mat, typically made of paper or fabric, and variously used for protecting surfaces or binding flowers, in food service presentation, or as a head covering or clothing ornamentation. It is characterized by openwork, which allows the surface of the underlying object to show through.

Etymology 
Doiley was a 17th-century London draper, who made popular "a woolen stuff, 'at once cheap and genteel,' introduced for summer wear in the latter part of the 17th c." At the time, it was used as an adjective, as in "doily stuffs" or "doily suit." Later, usage shifted to refer to "a small ornamental napkin used at dessert," known as a "doily-napkin."

Usage

Furniture protection 
In addition to their decorative function doilies have the practical role of protecting fine-wood furniture from the scratches caused by crockery or decorative objects such as nativity scenes, or from spilled tea when used on tea trays or with cups and saucers. When used to protect the backs and arms of chairs, they are serving as antimacassars.

Flower arrangement 
Doilies are traditionally used to bind the stems in posies (formal flower arrangements called tussie-mussies in the Victorian Era).

Food service and etiquette 
Doilies figure prominently in the custom of finger bowls, once common in formal, multi-course dinners. The linen doily (never paper) separates the dessert plate from the finger bowl. The custom requires that both doily and finger bowl are removed to the upper left of the place setting before briefly dipping fingertips into the water and drying them on the napkin. Failing to move both together is a faux pas. 
 
Disposable paper doilies "were designed as a cheaper but respectable alternative to crocheted linen doilies" and are commonly used to decorate plates, placed under the food for ornamentation.

Techniques 
They are crocheted, tatted or knitted out of cotton or linen thread. Many patterns for crocheting or knitting doilies were published by thread manufacturers in the first part of the 20th century. The designers were often uncredited. The designs could be circular or oval starting from the center and working outward, reminiscent of the polar coordinates system. Doilies, as well as other household items, may be made by crocheting rows on a grid pattern using a technique called filet crochet, similar to points on the cartesian coordinate system.

Contemporary designers continue to make patterns for modern hand craft enthusiasts. Although it may to some extent interfere with the original use, some doilies involve embroidery or have raised designs (rose petals, popcorn, or ruffles) rather than being flat.

Other 
An alternate term for “lipstick lesbian” is “doily dyke”.

See also
 Antimacassar
 Armenian needlelace
 Koniaków Lace
 Lace
 Medallion knitting
 Mountmellick embroidery
 Openwork
 Tenerife lace
 Placemat

References

Crochet
Linens
Serving and dining
Embroidery
Lace
Domestic implements